Rigmor Olsen (12 January 1907 – 9 January 1994) was a Danish swimmer. She competed in the women's 4 × 100 metre freestyle relay event at the 1928 Summer Olympics.

References

1907 births
1994 deaths
Danish female swimmers
Olympic swimmers of Denmark
Swimmers at the 1928 Summer Olympics
Sportspeople from Frederiksberg